Shannon Willoughby (born 15 January 1982) is a former female rugby union player. She previously captained Otago.

Willoughby was in the Black Ferns squad that won the 2006 Women's Rugby World Cup. She was instructed by Matthew Greenslade when she obtained her Commercial Pilots License from Ardmore Flying School in 2011.

Willoughby suffered a stroke at the age of 32. She discovered the benefits of aromatherapy diffusers and essential oils, she then founded Aromarrr NZ. In 2015 She beat the odds and returned to playing rugby and also received her aviation medical back after being told she would likely never fly again.

A 2017 IWF Global Women Athlete's Business Network member, Willoughby is now part of the IWF NZ Founding Committee.

References

External links
Black Ferns Profile

1982 births
Living people
New Zealand women's international rugby union players
New Zealand female rugby union players
Female rugby union players